Tetraazidomethane, is a colorless, highly explosive liquid. Its chemical structure consists of a carbon atom covalently bonded to four azide functional groups.

Synthesis
It was first prepared by Klaus Banert in 2006 by reaction of trichloroacetonitrile with sodium azide.

Uses
As with other polyazides, tetraazidomethane has interest as a high-energy-density material with potential uses in explosives, propellants, or fireworks. Silicon tetraazide is also a known compound.

Reactions
Banert has reported that tetraazidomethane participates in a number of reactions including hydrolysis, cycloaddition reactions with alkenes and alkynes, and reaction with phosphines to form phosphazenes.

References

Organoazides
Explosive chemicals